This is a list of Bomberman video games.



Console and PC games

Portable handheld games

Sub-series

Super Bomberman series

Bomberman Land series

Other games

Arcade games

Mobile and phone games

Compilations and re-releases

Spin-offs

Cancelled games

Clones

References
Notes

Citations

External links
Bomberman Series Game List - Hudson Soft (Japanese) on Wayback Machine - March 15, 2010.

"The 10-Best Video-Game Franchises". GamePro. July 7, 2006.

 
Bomberman